TSE or Tris/Saline/EDTA, is a buffer solution containing a mixture of Tris base, Sodium chloride and EDTA.

In molecular biology, TSE buffers are often used in procedures involving nucleic acids. Tris-acid solutions are effective buffers for slightly basic conditions, which keep DNA deprotonated and soluble in water. The concentration of tris in the solution is kept near 25 mM. EDTA is a chelator of divalent cations, particularly of magnesium (Mg2+). As these ions are necessary co-factors for many enzymes, including contaminant nucleases, the role of the EDTA is to protect the nucleic acids against enzymatic degradation. But since Mg2+ is also a co-factor for many useful DNA-modifying enzymes such as restriction enzymes and DNA polymerases, its concentration in TSE buffers is generally kept low (typically at around 2.5 mM). The sodium chloride is generally kept at a concentration of 0.05 M.

References 

Buffer solutions
Genetics techniques